Giammario Piscitella (born 24 March 1993) is an Italian professional footballer who plays as a winger for  club Rimini.

Club career

Genoa
As a graduate of Roma reserve team, Piscitella signed a new five-year contract in May 2012. On 30 July he was involved in the transfer of Mattia Destro (€16 million) from Genoa (€8.5 million) and Siena (€7.5 million), with Piscitella and Valerio Verre going to Genoa in co-ownership deal for €1.5 million each.

Pescara
In June 2013 Roma bought back the two players (with Verre tagged for €2.5million, Piscitella €1.5 million) from Genoa for €1 million cash plus Panagiotis Tachtsidis. On 1 July 2013, Piscitella left for Pescara for €1.5 million along with Matteo Politano for €500,000, as a direct swap for the return of Gianluca Caprari for €2 million.

Return to Roma
On 24 January 2014, Piscitella returned to Roma, swapping clubs with Caprari. On 30 January 2014, he was signed by Cittadella.

Piscitella joined Lega Pro club Pistoiese in summer 2014. the loan was renewed in summer 2015. On 5 January 2016, he was signed by Bassano in a temporary deal.

Novara
On 10 August 2019, he signed a two-year contract with Novara.

Rimini
On 15 September 2021, he joined Rimini in Serie D.

References

External links

1993 births
Living people
People from Nocera Inferiore
Sportspeople from the Province of Salerno
Footballers from Campania
Italian footballers
Association football forwards
Serie A players
Serie B players
Serie C players
Serie D players
A.S. Roma players
Genoa C.F.C. players
Modena F.C. players
Delfino Pescara 1936 players
A.S. Cittadella players
U.S. Pistoiese 1921 players
Bassano Virtus 55 S.T. players
Catania S.S.D. players
A.C. Prato players
A.C. Carpi players
Novara F.C. players
Rimini F.C. 1912 players